Behpesa Bagh (also Romanized as Behpesa Bāgh; also known as Behpasī Bāgh, Behpesī Bāgh, and Pay-ye Pas Bāgh) is a village in Otaqvar Rural District, Otaqvar District, Langarud County, Gilan Province, Iran. At the 2006 census, its population was 163, in 47 families.

References 

Populated places in Langarud County